Southfield School  (formerly known as Southfield School for Girls) is a girls' secondary school and coeducational sixth form with academy status, located in Kettering in the English county of Northamptonshire.

Previously a foundation school administered by Northamptonshire County Council, the school converted to academy status in August 2011, and in 2021 it joined with Kingsthorpe College in Northampton as part of the Orbis Education Trust, a Multi-Academy Trust. The school continues to coordinate with Northamptonshire County Council for admissions.

Southfield School offers GCSEs as programmes of study for girls. The school operates a coeducational sixth form, where students can choose to study from range of A Levels and BTECs.

After a period of sustained improvement, becoming the best performing school in Northamptonshire, in 2021 Southfield was awarded the World Class Schools Quality Mark.

Notable former pupils
Faryl Smith, mezzo-soprano

References

External links
Southfield School official website

Secondary schools in North Northamptonshire
Girls' schools in Northamptonshire
Academies in North Northamptonshire
Educational institutions established in 1976
1976 establishments in England